Jamie Fox (1954–2017) was an American politician.

Jamie Fox may also refer to:

 Jamie Fox (Canadian politician) (born 1964)
 Jamie Fox (fiddler), Native American musician

See also
 Jamie Foxx (born 1967), American actor
 Jimmie Foxx (1907–1967), American baseball player
 James Fox (disambiguation)